R interface or R reference point defines the point between a non-ISDN device and a terminal adapter (TA) which provides translation to and from such a device.

See also
 S interface
 T interface
 U interface

References
 

ITU-T recommendations
Integrated Services Digital Network